Barkhan may refer to:

Barkhan, a city in Pakistan
Barkhan District,  Pakistan
Barkhan Tehsil, a subdivision of Barkhan district
Barkhan, India, a village in India
Barchan, a type of sand dune
Barchan, a phase in the formation of Zastrugi (ridges on a snow surface)